Dolichoderus imitator is a species of ant in the genus Dolichoderus. Described by Emery in 1894, the species is endemic to Bolivia, Brazil and Ecuador.

References

Dolichoderus
Hymenoptera of South America
Insects described in 1894